Bryan Llenas (born July 12, 1988) is an American television news correspondent on the Fox News Channel. He has covered both national and international stories, including mass shootings, terror attacks and natural disasters. In 2012, HuffPost considered him to be one of the Top 50 Latino voices to follow on Twitter.

Early life
Llenas is from Boca Raton, Florida. He attended the University of Miami and graduated in 2010 with a degree in broadcast journalism and political science. There he was inducted into the Iron Arrow Honor Society, the “highest honor attained at the University of Miami,”  and in 2017 won the University of Miami "Communicator of the Year" Award.

Journalism career
Llenas is a correspondent at Fox News. Some of his first stories covered at Fox News were the 2014 World Cup in Brazil, the inauguration of Pope Francis in Rome, and the Pope's visit to the United States.

He has reported on the trial of Mexican Drug lord Joaquin 'El Chapo' Guzman in New York, the Bill Cosby trial, the Trump administrations family separation policy, the mass shooting at a church in Sutherland Springs, Texas, Hurricane Irma and Hurricane Maria in Puerto Rico, President Donald Trump's transition team, and the September 2016 terrorist bombings in both Manhattan and New Jersey.

Personal life
Llenas is gay and has talked openly about working for a conservative company as a gay minority and being accepted at Fox News.

See also
 LGBT culture in New York City
 List of LGBT people from New York City
 New Yorkers in journalism

References

1988 births
Living people
American people of Dominican Republic descent
Fox News people
Hispanic and Latino American people in television
Journalists from Florida
People from Boca Raton, Florida
LGBT people from Florida
American LGBT journalists
21st-century LGBT people